Henry Couchman of Balsall Temple, Warwickshire, an 18th-century architect and landscape gardener, designed the Old Drapers' Hall, Coventry (demolished) and helped complete Arbury Hall, Warwickshire, for Sir Roger Newdigate, including designing the magnificent saloon.

Biography
Henry Couchman was born 8 January 1737/38 in Ightham, Kent. He was the eldest child of carpenter Henry Couchman and Sarah (née Luck). He was locally schooled.

Initially, he worked for his father, cutting timber and repairing buildings. Rather than continue in the carpentry trade Henry obtained a job in Greenhithe making drawings for a house builder. He then found work with a London builder. He later lost his job "in consequence of belonging to a club of workers in a plan to raise their wages".

Couchman eventually found work with a builder in Piccadilly. He became foreman of the woodwork, working on projects for Lord March (later Duke of Queensbury). He then moved to work for several years building Packington Hall, Warwickshire for the Lord Aylesford, arriving in 1766.

Susannah Couchman of Temple Balsall, Warwickshire, was the daughter of Henry Couchman; she became the wife of Thomas Wedge of Chester.

References

Architects from Warwickshire
18th-century English architects
1738 births
Year of death missing
People from Ightham